Aeroflot Flight N-36 was a scheduled domestic Aeroflot passenger flight from Chernivtsi International Airport to Kyiv International Airport (Zhuliany), Ukrainian Soviet Socialist Republic that crashed on 17 December 1976 near Kyiv airport, resulting in 48 fatalities and 7 survivors.

Aircraft 
The aircraft involved in the accident was an Antonov An-24 designed to carry 50 passengers. It was built  in 1963, and made its first flight on 8 June 1963. At the  time of the accident the aircraft had accumulated 27,244 flying hours and 24,754 pressurization cycles.

Accident 
On 17 December 1976 at 20:32 Moscow time the An-24 took off from Chernivtsi on domestic flight N-36 from Chernivtsi to Kyiv airport with 50 passengers and five crew members on board.

The crew had a weather forecast of clouds at from 100 to 1000–1500 meters, strong south-east wind, mist, drizzle, snowfall, predicting a moderately bumpy flight with visibility of 1000–2000 meters, strong icing in clouds. By the time the aircraft 46722 left Chernivtsi, visibility in Kyiv International Airport (Zhuliany) had dropped to 800 meters and low clouds at 70 meters; wind there was weak but icing in the clouds was strong. The Aero-meteorological station had been making frequent weather observations but had not detected the moment when horizontal visibility in Zhuliany Airport became less than 700 meters (minimum visibility for An-24) and did not warn air traffic controllers. In violation of instructions, from 20:55 to 22:10 there was no continuous monitoring of visibility at landing direction: 81° magnetic bearing. Crews of incoming flights despite of weather did not require factual values of horizontal and vertical visibility.

The flight made its final approach to Kyiv airport at 81° bearing using a non-directional beacon and radiolocation system of landing (TESLA) by commands of landing controller. The airport's instrument landing system was out of service for maintenance and testing. Traffic controller did not guide flight by landing radar and didn't give information to crew at time of entering to the glide path. Because of this aircraft 46722 started lowering too late and vertical velocity was greater than designed.
atc 
At that moment air traffic control was in contact with 3 aircraft on the same radio frequency. As result, ATC commands were ambiguous. The An-24 twice requested distance to runway but both times the broadcast was stepped on by other aircraft. 2500 meters from runway end the An-24 descended below the published glide path but was not advised by ATC.At the critical height (100 m) pilots saw no runway lights but didn't abandon its approach.

At 30–35 meters above Earth surface “danger height” alarm was activated. Pilots pulled controls and aircraft had g-force of 1.9 g. But it was too late. Vertical velocity was too high and height reserve was too small. Two seconds later right part of aircraft had collided with a concrete fence of non-directional radio beacon station at 1265 meters from runway end and at 40 meters right from runway axis. Then aircraft had touched ground in station's yard by front and left landing gears, took off for a short time, then collide with a concrete fence at the opposite side of this yard. Seconds later An-24 collided by left wing with a group of trees, then the aircraft nose ran into a 4.5-meter railroad mound and the rest of the aircraft went on the rails and had stopped at 1150 m from the runway end 40 m right from the runway axis. Fire broke out and completely destroyed aircraft.

4 crew members and 44 passengers died in this accident. Flight attendant and 6 passengers survived; one of these passengers had no injuries.

Investigation 
Because aircraft had been destroyed by fire commission could not determine why danger height alarm probe did not trigger at 60 m height as it had to do. There were serious errors in work of aero-meteorological station which reports to air traffic controller horizontal visibility 700 m and vertical visibility of 50 m. But weather observed 30 seconds after the accident was below weather minimum for An-24. And aircraft 46440 which tied to landing 2 minutes and 6 seconds before aircraft 46722, went to dispersal field at Boryspil Airport because pilots did not see airfield lights. So real horizontal visibility at Zhuliany airport was below 700 meters and An-24 aircraft must not land in these conditions.

References

Aviation accidents and incidents in 1976
Aviation accidents and incidents in the Soviet Union
N-36
1976 in the Soviet Union
Accidents and incidents involving the Antonov An-24
December 1976 events in Europe
Aviation accidents and incidents in Ukraine
1976 in Ukraine
1970s in Kyiv